Palaung or De'ang or Taang may refer to:
Palaung people
Palaung language
Delaware Air National Guard

Language and nationality disambiguation pages